JTBC Golf&Sports is a South Korean cable TV sports channel. It was originally known as JTBC3 Fox Sports until 2020 but due to Disney phasing out the Fox brand it was renamed.

Programs

Current rights

Multi-sport events 

 Olympic Games (from 2026 to 2032)

Football 

K League 1

Golf 

LPGA
KPGA Golf
PGA Tour
The Open Championship
European Tour

Motorsport 

F1

MMA 

 ONE Championship

Handball 

 Handball Korea League

Former rights 

AFC (2017-2020):
2018 FIFA World Cup qualification – AFC Third Round (all 10 South Korea matches)
 2019 AFC Asian Cup
 AFC U-23 Championship (2018 and 2020)
AFC Champions League
AFC Cup  
AFC U-19 Championship  
AFC U-19 Women's Championship  
 2018 AFC Women's Asian Cup
 AFC U-16 Women's Championship
 AFC Men's Futsal Championship
 AFC U-20 Men's Futsal Championship
 AFC Women's Futsal Championship

 Bundesliga, 2. Bundesliga, DFL-Supercup (until 2019/20)
EAFF E-1 Football Championship & EAFF E-1 Football Championship (women) (2015)
A-League
French Open
Copa América (2019)
Africa Cup of Nations (2019)
Australian Open
Wimbledon (until 2021)
US Open (until 2021)

See also 
 KBS N Sports
 MBC Sports+
 SBS Sports
 SPOTV

References

JTBC
Television channels in South Korea
Sports television networks in South Korea
Korean-language television stations
South Korea
Golf in South Korea
Golf on television
Television channels and stations established in 2015